The Battle of Birdland (also released as Tenor Battle at Birdland and Jaws N' Stitt at Birdland) is a live album by saxophonists Sonny Stitt and Eddie Davis recorded at Birdland in New York City in 1954 and originally released on the Roost label.

Reception

Scott Yanow, in his review for Allmusic, calls the album "a spirited and typically competitive jam session". The All About Jazz review stated "both tenormen were in the prime of their great careers at this stage and the music is wonderful... this recording is a  rare and memorable item indeed".

Track listing 
All compositions by Sonny Stitt except as indicated
 "Jaws" (Eddie Davis) - 9:55
 "I Can't Get Started" (Ira Gershwin, Vernon Duke) - 7:21
 "Marchin'" - 8:45
 "S.O.S." - 7:50
 "Whoops!"  8:17 additional track on CD release
 "All the Things You Are" (Oscar Hammerstein II, Jerome Kern) - 8:23 additional track on CD release
 "Rollercoaster" - 9:06 additional track on CD release
 "Don't Blame Me" (Dorothy Fields, Jimmy McHugh) - 7:51 additional track on CD release

Personnel 
Eddie Davis, Sonny Stitt - tenor saxophone 
Harry "Doc" Bagby - organ
Charlie Rice - drums

References 

1955 live albums
Eddie "Lockjaw" Davis live albums
Sonny Stitt live albums
Roost Records live albums